Papunya Tula, registered as Papunya Tula Artists Pty Ltd, is an artist cooperative formed in 1972 in Papunya, Northern Territory, owned and operated by Aboriginal people from the Western Desert of Australia. The group is known for its innovative work with the Western Desert Art Movement, popularly referred to as "dot painting".  Credited with bringing contemporary Aboriginal art to world attention, its artists inspired many other Australian Aboriginal artists and styles.

Background
These displaced groups were primarily Pintupi, Luritja, Walpiri, Arrernte, and Anmatyerre peoples.

In 1971, Geoffrey Bardon, the school teacher at the community, encouraged the children to paint a mural using the traditional style of body and sand ceremonial art. This painting style was used for spiritual purposes, and so had strict protocols for its use. Many symbols depicted personal totems and Dreamings, and others more general Dreamtime creation stories. When some of the elder men saw what the children were doing, they felt the subject matter was more suited to adults.  They began creating a mural depicting the Honey Ant Dreaming. Traditionally, Papunya is the epicentre of the Honey Ant Dreaming, where songlines converge. The European-Australian administrators of Papunya later painted over the murals, which the curator Judith Ryan called "an act of cultural vandalism", noting that "[t]he school was de-Aboriginalized and the art no longer allowed to stand tall and defiant as the symbol of a resilient and indomitable people". While visible, the mural proved highly influential, leading other men to create smaller paintings of their Jukurrpa (Ancestral stories), on any available surface, including bits of old masonite, car bonnets, tin cans, and matchboxes. This explosion of artistic activity is generally regarded as the origin of contemporary Indigenous Australian art.

The collective, originally entirely Aboriginal Australian men, formed in 1972. They derived the name tula from a small hill near Papunya, a Honey Ant Dreaming site. A few women, notably Pansy Napangardi, began to paint for the company in the late 1980s.  It was not until 1994 that women generally began to participate.

While the collective artists used a style of painting traditional in the sand and for body adornment in ceremonies, most of them had never painted before in Western style – that is, using acrylic paint and a hard surface. As their work gained in popularity, the artists omitted or changed many of the spiritual symbols for public viewing, as the Aboriginal community criticised the artists for revealing "too much of their sacred heritage". According to Ryan:

For Hetti Perkins and Hannah Fink, the artists through their paintings "trace the genealogies of their ancestral inheritance".   And comment that "Through the paintings of the Papunya Tula Artists we experience the anguish of exile and the liberation of exodus. ... In refiguring the Australian landscape, the artists express what has always been known to them. And in revealing this vision to an outside audience, Papunya Tula artists have reclaimed the interior of the Australian continent as Aboriginal land. If exile is the dream of home, the physical longing for homelands expressed in the early paintings has now been answered".

In the late 1970s and early 1980s, after the establishment of the Aboriginal Land Rights Act 1976, many of the people left Papunya for their traditional lands, but the art cooperative persisted and continued to grow. For many years the market and museums virtually ignored their work. A major exception was the Museum and Art Gallery of the Northern Territory (MAGNT), that has the largest collection of just over 220 early works acquired between 1972 and 1976, thanks to the visionary efforts of the MAGNT Director Dr Colin Jack Hinton and Alice Springs gallery owner Pat Hogan. This was still as of 2008 the nation's largest collection of early boards. The National Gallery of Victoria did not acquire any works produced by the collective until 1987, when Judith Ryan convinced the current director to purchase 10 of the works.

In 2007, a single painting by Papunya Tula artist Clifford Possum Tjapaltjarri set a record at auction for price commanded for Aboriginal art, bringing £1.03 million (or $2.4 million), more than twice as much as the previous record-holder.

Today

Exhibitions

Art Gallery of NSW 2000 Exhibition
In 2000, the Art Gallery of NSW held an exhibition, curated by Hetti Perkins, for the Sydney Olympic Games Arts Festival. The exhibition, entitled Papunya Tula, Genesis and Genius, was the first major retrospective exhibition of the cooperative.

National Museum of Australia 2007–2008 Exhibition
For a period of several months (27 November 2007 to 3 February 2008), the National Museum of Australia exhibited a collection of Papunya paintings from the first few years of the movement. Most of the works displayed in the collection had not been seen before by the general public as most of these paintings were bought by the Aboriginal Arts Board (now defunct) of the 1970s-1980s. The exhibition contains some of the most priceless and earliest works by the first generation, senior Papunya painters. These paintings were previously displayed in government offices and embassies. Curated by Professor Vivien Johnson, the exhibition was significant in introducing the movement's importance to the general audience.

Musée du Quai Branly
Two Papunya artists, Tommy Watson and Ningura Napurrula, are also represented in Paris at the Musée du Quai Branly, dedicated to indigenous art of the world. Napurrula's signature black-and-white motifs appear superimposed on the ceiling of the administration part of the museum's building.

Papunya Tula artists

First generation men (the Bardon years 1971–73)

Anatjari Tjakamarra
Billy Stockman Tjapaltjarri
Charlie Tarawa (Tjaruru) Tjungurrayi
Charlie Tjakamarra
Charlie Egalie Tjapaltjarri
Clifford Possum Tjapaltjarri
David Corby Tjapaltjarri
Dinny Nolan Tjampitjinpa
Freddy West Tjakamarra
Johnny Scobie Tjapanangka
Johnny Warrangkula Tjupurrula
Kaapa Tjampitjinpa
Long Jack Phillipus Tjakamarra
Mick Namarari Tjapaltjarri
Old Mick Tjakamarra
Old Tutama Tjapangati
Old Walter Tjampitjinpa (Lynch)
Pinta Pinta Tjapanangka
Shorty Lungkata Tjungurayyi
Tim Leura Tjapaltjarri
Timmy Payungka Tjapangati
Turkey Tolson Tjupurrula
Uta Uta Tjangala
Yala Yala Gibbs Tjungurayyi

Second generation men 

Adam Gibbs Tjapaltjarri
Andrew Tolson Tjakamarra
Bobby West Tjupurrula
Charlie Tjapangati
Charlie Wallabi Tjungurrayi
Donald Matthews Tjapanangka
George Tjampu Tjapaltjarri
George Tjungurayi
George Ward Tjungurayi
James Gibson Tjapaltjarri
Jeremiah West Tjakamarra
John Corby Tjapaltjarri
Johnny Yungut Tjupurrula
Joseph Jurra Tjapaltjarri
Kanya Tjapangati
Kenny Williams Tjampitjinpa
Kumantje Jagamara, aka Michael Nelson Tjakamarra (1946–2020), joined 1983
Lindsay Corby Tjapaltjarri
Long Jack Phillippus Tjakamarra
Matthew West Tjupurrula
Morris Gibson Tjapaltjarri
Patrick Tjungurrayi
Ray James Tjangala
Raymond Maxwell Tjampitjinpa
Raymond Tjapaltjarri
Richard Yukenbarri Tjakamarra
Ronnie Tjampitjinpa
Tony Tjakamarra
Warlimpirrnga Tjapaltjarri

Women

Bombatu Napangati
Doreen Reid Nakamarra
Eileen Napaltjarri
Kawayi Nampitjinpa
Elizabeth Marks Nakamarra
Josephine Napurrula
Kim Napurrula
Lorna Brown Napanangka
Maisie Gibson Napurrula
Makinti Napanangka
Mary Brown Napangati
Miriam Napanangka
Monica Napaltjarri
Naata Nungurrayi
Nancy Nungurrayi
Narrabri Nakamarra
Ningura Napurrula
Norah Nelson Napaljarri
Nyurapayia Nampitjinpa
Pansy Napangardi
Pantjiya Nungurrayi
Patricia Napanangka
Payu Napaltjarri
Tatali Napurrula
Tjunkiya Napaltjarri
Walangkura Napanangka
Yalti Napangati
Yukultji Napangati
Yuyuya Nampitjinpa

See also
Australian Aboriginal art
Geoffrey Bardon
Honey ant dreaming
Kluge-Ruhe Aboriginal Art Collection
Papunya
Toas

Notes

References

Dreamings of the Desert: Aboriginal dot paintings of the Western Desert, Art Gallery of South Australia, 1996, 
Geoffrey Bardon, Aboriginal Art of the Western Desert,1979, Adelaide: Rigby
Geoffrey Bardon, Papunya Tula: Art of the Western Desert, 1991,  Sydney: McPhee Gribble/Penguin
Geoffrey Bardon and James Bardon, Papunya: A Place Made After the Story: The Beginnings of the Western Desert Painting Movement, 2006, Miegunyah Press, University of Melbourne

Vivien Johnson (ed), Papunya Painting: Out of the desert 2007, Canberra: National Museum of Australia

Further reading

Focus on Makinti Napanangka, "one of the most keenly studied and collected of the Papunya Tula art stars" The Australian

External links
Papunya Tula Gallery
Papunya Tula Exhibition, Art Gallery of NSW, 2000.
Papunya Painting, National Museum of Australia Exhibition, 28 November 2007 – 3 February 2008
Icons of the Desert: Early Aboriginal Paintings from Papunya, touring exhibition, United States, 2009.
Tjukurrtjanu - Origins of Western Desert Art

Australian art movements
Australian Aboriginal art
Australian artist groups and collectives
Artist cooperatives
Cooperatives in Australia